South Bluff is a summit in the U.S. state of Wisconsin.

South Bluff was so named on account of its location relative to nearby North Bluff.

References

Landforms of Wood County, Wisconsin
Mountains of Wisconsin